Jan Johansen is the name of:

 Jan Johansen (canoeist) (born 1944), Norwegian Olympic canoeist
 Jan Johansen (politician) (born 1955), Danish politician and MF
 Jan Johansen (singer) (born 1966), Swedish singer
 Jan Arvid Johansen (1947–2017), Norwegian musician

See also
 Jan Johansson (disambiguation)